Rauza Muhamedzhanovna Islanova (born February 8, 1948, in Moscow, Russian SFSR, Soviet Union) is a prominent Russian tennis coach and former tennis player.

Early life and career
Born in Moscow to Tatar parents, she grew up next to Sokolniki Park near the Spartak club, where many sports were offered. She first practiced figure skating, skiing and cycling before starting tennis at age 10. Her first coach was K. Borisova. She was the Soviet champion in the 1965-1966 season for girls singles.

She attended State University of Physical Education, graduated of the Order of Lenin and later received the rank of master in sports of international class (1976). During her tennis career, she played for the Spartak Tennis Club, and reached her highest seniors rank of the USSR in 1968, finishing fifth.

Coaching

Since 1976, she has worked at the Spartak Tennis Club. She is well known as the mother and first coach of her two children Marat Safin and Dinara Safina, who both reached world No. 1. 

She also coached Elena Dementieva, Anastasia Myskina, and Anna Kournikova during the very early years of their tennis careers.

References

1948 births
Living people
Russian tennis coaches
Tatar people of Russia
Tennis players from Moscow
Tatar sportspeople
Soviet female tennis players